The Tonopah Liquor Company Building is a historic building located on Main St. in Tonopah, Nevada. The building was constructed in 1906 by the Tonopah Liquor Company. The stone building was designed in the Classical Revival style and features a large pediment with a stone cornice. While the building was one of many stone structures built in Tonopah's early history, it is now one of only four remaining in the town; a local historic survey claimed it to be the most well-crafted of the remaining buildings.

The building was added to the National Register of Historic Places on May 20, 1982.

References

Tonopah, Nevada
Buildings and structures in Nye County, Nevada
Commercial buildings completed in 1905
Commercial buildings on the National Register of Historic Places in Nevada
National Register of Historic Places in Tonopah, Nevada
Neoclassical architecture in Nevada
1905 establishments in Nevada